Peter Jordan (born 26 April 1967) is a German actor. He appeared in more than seventy films since 1995.

Selected filmography

References

External links 

1967 births
Living people
German male film actors